This is a list of demographics articles. "Demographics articles" refers to the figures related to the population of a specific country, including population density, ethnicity, education level, health of the populace, economic status, religious affiliations and other aspects regarding the population.

The primary topic is demography.

Index

A

B

C

D

E

F

G

H

I

J

K

L

M

N

O

P

Q

R

S

T

U

V

W

Y

Z

Demographics